= 1960 Puerto Rican judicial reform referendum =

Ballot measure in US territory

- 8 November 1960

Results
| Choice | Votes | % |
|---|---|---|
| Yes | 380,523 | 78.41% |
| No | 104,748 | 21.59% |

A referendum on judicial reform was held in Puerto Rico on 8 November 1960. The changes were approved by 78% of voters.

== Results ==
| Choice | Votes | % |
|---|---|---|
| For | 380,523 | 78.41 |
| Against | 104,748 | 21.59 |
| Total | 485,271 | 100.00 |
| Registered voters/turnout | 941,034 | – |
Source: Nohlen
